Micrurus annellatus, commonly known as Annellated coral snake, is a species of venomous elapid snake native to southeastern Ecuador, eastern Peru, Bolivia, and western Brazil. There are three recognized subspecies, including the nominate subspecies described here.

Subspecies 
There are 3 recognized subspecies:
Micrurus annellatus annellatus (Peters, 1871)
Micrurus annellatus balzanii (Boulenger, 1898)
Micrurus annellatus bolivianus (Roze, 1967)

Common names 
Annellated coral snake. In Spanish: cobra-coral anelada,  coral anilada, naca-naca.

Description 
Its color pattern may vary between subspecies: overall dark blue to black, with narrow rings of white, yellow, pale blue (M. a. annellatus), or dull red (M. a. balzani). Tricolored specimens are black, red, & yellow and color patterns do not occur in "triads".

Habitat
It is mainly found in montane wet forest and cloud forest at elevations ranging from 300 up to 2,000 m.

References 

annellatus
Snakes of South America
Reptiles of Bolivia
Reptiles of Brazil
Reptiles of Ecuador
Reptiles of Peru
Reptiles described in 1871
Taxa named by Wilhelm Peters